A life guard (also known as household troops) is a military unit charged with protecting a high-ranking individual, such as a monarch.

Germany 
Since the 15th century,  has been the designation for the military security guards who protected  (royals and nobles) — usually members of the highest nobility who ruled over states of the Holy Roman Empire and later its former territory — from danger. The  should not be mixed up with bodyguard, which may refer also to a single private individual.

France 
In the Kingdom of France, the Garde du Corps was established (with reference to the ) in 1440. It was abolished after the French Revolution, re-established in 1815 after the Bourbon Restoration, and finally dissolved in 1830 after the July Revolution. In addition, Napoleon III set up the Cent-gardes for his own protection.

List of life guard units
Germany:
Kingdom of Bavaria: Royal Bavarian Infantry Lifeguards Regiment - part of the Bavarian Army
Kingdom of Prussia:  Prussian Life Guards - part of the Guards Corps of the Prussian Army
Nazi Germany: 1st SS Panzer Division "Leibstandarte SS Adolf Hitler" - incorporated into the Waffen-SS during World War 2
Kingdom of France:  French Life Guards - part of the Maison Militaire du Roi de France of the French Royal Army
Imperial Russia: Imperial Guard (Leibgarde) – regiments of life guards that evolved into many elite combat units in the Imperial Russian Army
United Kingdom: Life Guards – part of the British Army
Sweden: Life Guards – part of the Swedish Army
Denmark: Royal Life Guards – part of the Danish Army
United States: Washington's Life Guard - part of the Continental Army

See also 
 Royal guard

References 

Military organization
Lists of military units and formations
Protective security units
 
 Infantry